Richard Kolitsch (24 October 1989 – 23 May 2014) was a German football midfielder who played for FC Carl Zeiss Jena II.

Career 
He began his career in the youth team of FV Dresden-Nord, before he moved to FC Carl Zeiss Jena in January 2007.

Kolitsch was under manager Henning Bürger promoted to first team on the last but one matchday in the 2007–08 season. He made his debut on matchday 33 against 1. FC Kaiserslautern after substitution in the halftime.

Personal life 
His father Uwe Kolitsch is former professional player of SpVgg Erkenschwick.

References

1989 births
2014 deaths
German footballers
FC Carl Zeiss Jena players
Footballers from Dresden
2. Bundesliga players
3. Liga players
Association football midfielders